Gerhard Theodor Alexander Graf von Kanitz (9 April 1885 – 15 June 1949) was a German politician of the  German National People's Party (DNVP) and the German People's Party (DVP). He was a member of several Prussian and German Parliaments and served as Weimar Germany's  Minister of Food and Agriculture from 1923 to 1926

Biography 

Kanitz was born in Podangen, East Prussia (current-day Podągi, Poland), the son of the conservative politician Hans von Kanitz. He attended the Wilhelmgymnasium in Königsberg and served in the 3rd (East Prussian) Cuirassiers "Count Wrangel". Kanitz took over his family estate at Podangen after his father's death in 1913

Following his service in World War I he became chairman of the agricultural association in the district of Preußisch Holland (Pasłęk) and member of the provisional German economic council. He joined the  DNVP after the  German Revolution of 1918–1919 , but left the party in 1923, later on he joined the German People's Party (DVP).

From 1919 to 1921 Kanitz was a member of the  Prussian Constitutional Assembly and member of the Weimar German Parliament from 7 March 1921 until May 1924 representing the constituency of East Prussia. From 1928 to 1932 he represented the DVP in the Prussian House of Representatives and from 1929 to 1933 he was a member of the East Prussian provincial parliament.

Kanitz served as Minister of Food and Agriculture from 6 October 1923 to 19 January 1926 in the Second Stresemann cabinet, the First and Second Marx cabinet and the First Luther cabinet.

Kanitz died in 1949 in  Frankfurt-Sossenheim.

Family 

Kanitz married Valeska Freiin von Tiele-Winckler (1893–1949) in 1912.

References 

1885 births
1949 deaths
People from East Prussia
People from Elbląg County
German National People's Party politicians
Government ministers of Germany
Prussian politicians
Members of the Prussian House of Representatives
Members of the Reichstag of the Weimar Republic
German People's Party politicians
Von Kanitz family